Lajos is a Hungarian masculine given name, cognate to the English Louis. People named Lajos include:

Hungarian monarchs:

 Lajos I, 1326-1382 (ruled 1342-1382)
 Lajos II, 1506-1526 (ruled 1516-1526)

In Hungarian politics:

 Lajos Aulich, second Minister of War of Hungary
 Lajos Batthyány, first Prime Minister of Hungary
 Count Lajos Batthyány de Németújvár, county head of Győr and Governor of Fiume
 Lajos Dinnyés, Prime Minister of Hungary from 1947 to 1948
 Lajos Kossuth, Hungarian lawyer, politician and Regent of Hungary

In football:

 Lajos Baróti, coach of the Hungary national football team
 Lajos Czeizler, Hungarian football coach
 Lajos Détári, retired Hungarian football player
 Lajos Sătmăreanu, former Romanian football player
 Lajos Tichy, Hungarian footballer

In art:

 Lajos Csordák, Hungarian/Slovak painter
 Lajos Markos, Hungarian American painter 
 Lajos Koltai, Hungarian cinematographer and film director

In Hungarian literature:

 Lajos Bíró, Hungarian novelist, playwright, and screenwriter
 Lajos Egri, author of The Art of Dramatic Writing
 Lajos Hevesi, Jewish Hungarian journalist and author

In chess:

 Lajos Portisch, Hungarian chess player
 Lajos Steiner, Hungarian chess player

In other fields:

 Lajos Bárdos, Hungarian composer and professor of music at the Franz Liszt Academy of Music
 Lajos Pósa, Hungarian mathematician
 Lajos Werkner (1883–1943), Hungarian 2x Olympic champion saber fencer
 Zoltán Lajos Bay, Hungarian physicist

See also 
Kossuth Lajos tér, a Metro station in Budapest

Hungarian masculine given names